is a Japanese politician of the Democratic Party of Japan, a member of the House of Representatives in the Diet (national legislature). A native of Iwaki, Fukushima and graduate of the University of Tokyo, he was elected in 1996 as the mayor of Iwaki. After an  unsuccessful run in 2000, he was elected to the House of Representatives for the first time in 2003.

References

External links
 Official website in Japanese.

Living people
1949 births
Democratic Party of Japan politicians
Members of the House of Representatives (Japan)
Mayors of places in Japan
21st-century Japanese politicians